The 2022 CS U.S. International Figure Skating Classic was held at the Olympic Center in Lake Placid, New York on September 12–15, 2022. It was the first event in the 2022–23 ISU Challenger Series. Medals were awarded in the disciplines of men's singles, women's singles, pair skating, and ice dance.

Entries
The International Skating Union published the list of entries on August 18, 2022.

Changes to preliminary assignments

Results

Men

Women

Pairs

Ice dance

References 

U.S. International Figure Skating Classic
U.S. International Figure Skating Classic
Sports in Lake Placid, New York
CS